Tony Stewart's Sprint Car Racing is a sprint car racing video game developed and published by Monster Games in collaboration with sprint car and NASCAR team owner and former driver Tony Stewart. It was released for the PlayStation 4 and Xbox One on February 14, 2020 and on Microsoft Windows on February 21, 2020. The game can be purchased with its sister stock car racing game, Tony Stewart's All American Racing, also produced by Monster Games. The game can only be purchased at Walmart, because of a deal with Stewart and the corporation.

Gameplay 
Tony Stewart's Sprint Car Racing is a racing simulator, where players can race three different types of sprint cars through 24 fantasy tracks. In career mode, players start in the All-Star TQ Midgets and have to race their way up to the 410 Winged Sprint Cars in the All Star Circuit of Champions. There is also a 24-player online mode and an offline split-screen mode for multiplayer.

Reviews 
Game Informer and TheXboxHub gave the game a 70% score.

References 

2020 video games
Monster Games games
Multiplayer and single-player video games
PlayStation 4 games
Racing video games
Split-screen multiplayer games
Video games based on real people
Video games developed in the United States
Windows games
Xbox One games